Tarboro Town Common is a historic town common located at Tarboro, Edgecombe County, North Carolina. The common was established in 1760, and is an open space containing several memorials and a fountain. The commons contains five contributing objects: the Cotton Press; a Confederate memorial (1904); an obelisk; a memorial to the Spanish–American War dead; and a two-tier, cast iron fountain.

It was listed on the National Register of Historic Places in 1970. It is located in the Tarboro Historic District.

References

Parks on the National Register of Historic Places in North Carolina
1760 establishments in North Carolina
Buildings and structures in Edgecombe County, North Carolina
National Register of Historic Places in Edgecombe County, North Carolina
Parks in North Carolina
Geography of Edgecombe County, North Carolina
Tourist attractions in Edgecombe County, North Carolina
Individually listed contributing properties to historic districts on the National Register in North Carolina